The  was a  commuter rail in Hyōgo Prefecture, Japan owned and operated by Hanshin Electric Railway. The line was closed in 1962.

History
The line connecting Deyashiki and Higashihama opened on April 14, 1929, 1435mm gauge electrified at 600 VDC.

The section between Takasu and Higashihama closed on April 15, 1960. The remaining section closed on December 1, 1962 for construction of the Second Hanshin National Highway (Route 43).

Stations

See also
 List of railway lines in Japan

References
This article incorporates material from the corresponding article in the Japanese Wikipedia

Amagasaki Kaigan Line
Railway lines opened in 1929
Railway lines closed in 1962